Mindaugas Girdžiūnas (born 20 January 1989) is a Lithuanian professional basketball player currently playing for Neptūnas Klaipėda.
Mindaugas joined Neptūnas in 2009, after showing good performance in Lithuanian third strongest basketball league - Regional Basketball League playing for Klaipėdos Tekoda. In 2011 January player was loaned to Klaipėdos Nafta-Universitetas which plays in NKL.

International career 
Following the solid season, in 2015 Girdžiūnas was included into the Lithuania men's national basketball team head coach Jonas Kazlauskas extended candidates list. Though, he was not invited into the training camp later on. Otherwise happened in 2016, when he was invited into the national team training camp for the first time. He was released from the team on July 14.

References

 Mindaugas Girdžiūnas. Lietuvos Krepšinio Lyga (Lithuanian Basketball League). Accessed 2011-09-06.

1989 births
Living people
BC Neptūnas players
BC Nevėžis players
BC Rytas players
Lithuanian men's basketball players
Point guards